Theater Organ Society may refer to one of several organizations:

American Theatre Organ Society
Cinema Organ Society
Theatre Organ Society of Australia
Theatre Organ Society International